Second Skin is an American gothic rock band formed in 1991 by singer-songwriter Arron, the frontman of the Seattle-based band, Flesh of my Flesh. Second Skin's sound has been described as "a culmination of punk aggression, early Gothic sensibility and Death Rock driven passions" with "hard rhythmic beats and dark backdrops."

Featured in Mick Mercer's Music to Die For, a listing of bands that were influential in the gothic rock scene, as well as Oskar Terramortis' upcoming This is Gothic Rock book (to be released in 2013), Second Skin has played alongside Rozz Williams (of bands Christian Death and Shadow Project), the Mission UK, the Misfits, Killing Joke, Andi Sexgang, Gary Numan, Missing Persons, Modern English, Human Drama, The Damned, and New Model Army, and has been featured on over 30 studio albums, EPs and compilations.

Second Skin's single "Liberata Me" inspired the film of the same name, Liberata Me, which won best short subject at the New York Film festival. The film featured music and a cameo by Second Skin. Director Pearry Reginald Teo then cast Arron of Second Skin to play the gatekeeper of purgatory in the follow-up, award-winning film Children of the Arcana.

Second Skin is also the first band to produce a darkwave/deathrock 3D music video.

Second Skin's latest release, Illa Exuro in Silentium, the band's fourth studio album, is the follow-up to the band's 2005 album Black Eyed Angel.

In August 2013, it was announced that Second Skin's fifth studio album will be released in the fall of 2013.

Discography
Hymns for the Hollow – 1993, Euphoria Productions
Choir Invisible – 2000, Euphoria Productions
Black Eyed Angel – 2005, Palace Of Worms Records
Illa Exuro in Silentium – 2007, Palace Of Worms Records

Limited release tour EPS and singles
The Scourging and the Crowning – 1991, Euphoria Productions
Tease – 1998, Euphoria Productions
Skin Samples (dance remixes) – 2000, Euphoria Productions
Flesh Wounds – 2002, Euphoria Productions
Taste of Angels – 2003, Euphoria Productions
Liberata Me – 2004, Euphoria Productions
The Club Mixes – Flesh Wounds – 2005, Euphoria Productions
I The East – East Vs. West Mix – 2005, Euphoria Productions

Soundtracks
Liberata Me – Liberate Me, Trance – 2003, Euphoria Productions, PhysferScreamers Productions

Compilations
Tales from the Vault vol. 1 – Sweet Nothing – 1995 Alligence records/11mghz
Implosion New music sampler – Sweet Nothing (Raw) – 1996, Euphoria Productions
Children of the Damned – Nasty – 1996, Apollyon Records/Cleopatra Records
The Gothic Grimoire – Compilation 1/1997 – Zero Below (Antarctic Mix) – 1997, Celtic Circle Productions
New Wave Goes to Hell – You Spin Me 'Round (Like a Record) – 1998, Cleopatra Records
New Alternatives Four – Sweet Nothing – 1998, Nightbreed Recordings
A Tribute to the Mission – Forevermore – Wake (RSV) – 1999, Équinoxe Records
The Unquiet Grave Volume One – Sweet Nothing – 1999, Cleopatra Records
Chain D.L.K. Compilation CD #2 – Club Sexxx – 1999, Chain D.L.K.
Goth Oddity 2000: A Tribute to David Bowie – Let's Dance – 2000, Cleopatra Records
Only Sorrow – Liberata Me – 2001, Lee Whipple
Kiss The Night: A Collection Of Unusual Gothic Love Songs – Still My Love – 2002, Cleopatra Records
The Spooky Halloween Creepshow – Liberata Me – 2002, Apollyon Records
Our Voices – A Tribute to the Cure – Pictures of You – 2004, Équinoxe Records
Blackchurch Vol. II – I The East – 2004, X5-452
Tales from the Vault vol. 2 – I The East (Alternative Mix) – 2005 Alligence records/11mghz
80's Punked – Cry For Love – 2009, unknown
Gothic Visions II – The Narcissist – 2011, Echozone
Shadowplay – A Tribute to Joy Division – Control (She's Lost) – 2013, SyborgMusic

Filmography and music videos
Liberata Me – 2003, Euphoria Productions, PhysferScreamers Productions
Children of the Arcana – 2003, Aaquinas Productions, Ascension Pictures
:Per:Version: Vol. 15 – Still My Love – 2005, Ritual
Gothic Visions II – Still My Love – 2011, Echozone
Gothic Visions III – Six Ways From Sunday (filmed in both 2D and 3D) – 2012, Echozone

References

External links
Official website
Label website

American industrial music groups
American dark wave musical groups
American gothic rock groups
American death rock groups